Captain Arturo Prat Base is a Chilean Antarctic research station located at Iquique Cove, Greenwich Island in the South Shetland Islands, Antarctica.

Opened February 6, 1947 by the First Chilean Antarctic Expedition, it is the oldest Chilean Antarctic station. Until March 1, 2006, it was a base of the Chilean Navy, on which date it was handed over to the regional government of Magallanes and Antártica Chilena Region. Until February 2004, it had been a permanent base. Afterwards, it had served as a summer base for ionospheric and meteorologic research. There have been plans to reopen the station for permanent occupation starting March 2008. The base is named for Captain Arturo Prat, a Chilean naval officer.

Historic sites
 A concrete monolith was erected in 1947 near the base as a point of reference for Chilean Antarctic hydrographic surveys. It represents an important pre-IGY activity in Antarctica, and is preserved and maintained by personnel from the base. It has been designated a Historic Site or Monument (HSM 32), following a proposal by Chile to the Antarctic Treaty Consultative Meeting.
 A shelter and cross with plaque was erected near the base and named after Lieutenant Commander González Pacheco, who died in 1960 while in charge of the station. It commemorates events related to a person whose role and the circumstances of his death have both symbolic and educational value relating to human activities in Antarctica. It has been designated a Historic Site or Monument (HSM 33), following a proposal by Chile to the Antarctic Treaty Consultative Meeting.
 A bust of Chilean naval hero Arturo Prat was erected at the base in 1947. It represents pre-IGY activities and has symbolic value relating to Chilean presence in Antarctica. It has been designated a Historic Site or Monument (HSM 34), following a proposal by Chile to the Antarctic Treaty Consultative Meeting.
 A wooden cross and statue of the Virgin of Carmel was erected in 1947 near the base. It represents pre-IGY activities and has both symbolic and architectural value. It has been designated a Historic Site or Monument (HSM 35), following a proposal by Chile to the Antarctic Treaty Consultative Meeting.

Climate 
The climate is maritime polar (Köppen: ET), being on the coast of the peninsula with less severe averages than expected in Antarctica. Extreme temperatures can reach  in July, which is still quite bearable to humans protected due to considerable moderation of the sea, and a rare heat wave caused the temperature to reach , a relatively high value. The climate is quite humid for its location and precipitation is fairly well distributed, so that even in the driest months it receives more precipitation than almost all of the Mediterranean zone.

Maps

 L.L. Ivanov et al. Antarctica: Livingston Island and Greenwich Island, South Shetland Islands. Scale 1:100,000 topographic map. Sofia: Antarctic Place-names Commission of Bulgaria, 2005.
 L.L. Ivanov. Antarctica: Livingston Island and Greenwich, Robert, Snow and Smith Islands. Scale 1:120,000 topographic map. Troyan: Manfred Wörner Foundation, 2010.  (First edition 2009. )
 Antarctic Digital Database (ADD). Scale 1:250000 topographic map of Antarctica. Scientific Committee on Antarctic Research (SCAR). Since 1993, regularly upgraded and updated.

Gallery

See also
 List of Antarctic research stations
 List of Antarctic field camps

Notes

References

External links

 Official website Chilean antarctic Institute
 Official website Chilean Navy
 COMNAP Antarctic Facilities
 COMNAP Antarctic Facilities Map
 Map of Greenwich and Livingston Islands

Buildings and structures completed in 1947
Chilean Antarctic Territory
Geography of Greenwich Island
Historic Sites and Monuments of Antarctica
Outposts of the South Shetland Islands
1947 establishments in Antarctica